Myer Fredman (29 January 1932 – 4 July 2014) was a British-Australian conductor.

He studied at Dartington Hall and in London with Peter Gellhorn, Vilém Tauský, Sir Adrian Boult, and was assistant conductor to Otto Klemperer, Vittorio Gui, Sir John Pritchard and Sir Charles Mackerras.

He was conductor at the Glyndebourne Festival 1963–74.  He was involved in the creation of Glyndebourne Touring Opera, of which he was musical director for seven years 1968-74.  After moving to Australia he became musical director of the State Opera of South Australia 1974–80, and conductor and artistic associate with Opera Australia 1983–98.

Myer Fredman conducted the Australian premieres of Sir Michael Tippett's opera The Midsummer Marriage (in the presence of the composer), and Benjamin Britten's opera Death in Venice, at consecutive Adelaide Festivals.

His world-premiere recordings include Arnold Bax's 1st and 2nd symphonies and Havergal Brian's 6th symphony, all with the London Philharmonic Orchestra, and Brian's 16th symphony with the Royal Philharmonic Orchestra; and Peter Sculthorpe's Piano Concerto and a television opera, Quiros. His other recordings included the music of Britten, Delius, Vaughan Williams, Respighi, Rubbra, Sir Eugene Goossens, Arthur Benjamin, Richard Meale, Robert Still, and Ross Edwards.

He also conducted the premieres of some other of Havergal Brian's symphonies, and he was a Vice-President of the Havergal Brian Society.

Myer Fredman orchestrated and arranged instrumental and operatic music by J. S. Bach, John Dowland, Mozart, Donizetti, Tchaikovsky, Puccini and Elgar.

He was the first person to write extensively of the role of the conductor in the operas of Mozart, in From Idomeneo to Die Zauberflote; A conductor's commentary

The Italian Government awarded Myer Fredman the medal Per Servizio della Musica e Cultura Italiana.

Fredman was a teacher to many musicians, including Kim Sutherland.

He moved to Hobart, Tasmania where he conducted and taught as Adjunct Professor at the University of Tasmania's Conservatorium of Music.  He was also involved in creating The Tasmanian Discovery Orchestra. He died in Hobart on 4 July 2014, aged 82.

References

External links
 
 

1932 births
2014 deaths
British male conductors (music)
Australian conductors (music)
20th-century Australian musicians
20th-century British conductors (music)
20th-century British male musicians